Kumar Mridul (born 5 October 1988) is an Indian cricketer. He made his List A debut for Bihar in the 2018–19 Vijay Hazare Trophy on 4 October 2018.

References

External links
 

1988 births
Living people
Indian cricketers
Bihar cricketers
Place of birth missing (living people)